Saul is a masculine given name of Hebrew origin (Shaul), meaning "ask/question".

People named Saul include:

 Saul Adadi (1850–1918), Sephardic Hakham and rosh yeshiva in the Tripoli Jewish community
 Saul Alinsky (1909–1972), American political activist
 Saúl Álvarez (born 1990), Mexican boxer, WBA - WBC middleweight champion
 Saúl Armendáriz (born 1970), Mexican wrestler under the ring name Cassandro
 Saul Ascher (1767–1822), Jewish narrative writer and publicist
 Saul Bass (1920–1996), film graphic designer
 Saul Bellow (1915–2005), Canadian author, Nobel Prize for Literature and the Pulitzer Prize
 Saúl Berjón (born 1986), Spanish footballer known as Saúl
 Saul Chaplin (1912–1997), American composer and musical director, three-time Oscar winner
 Saúl Craviotto (born 1984), Spanish sprint canoer, Olympic and world champion
 Saul Dubow, South African historian and academic
 Saúl Fernández García (born 1985), Spanish footballer
 Slash (musician), British-American musician Saul Hudson, guitarist of Guns N' Roses
 Saul Goodman (born 1960), Fictional Albuquerque-based attorney featured in hit TV series, Breaking Bad and Better Call Saul
 Saul Katz (born 1939), President of the New York Mets baseball team
 Saul Kripke (born 1940), American philosopher and logician
 Saul Landau (1936-2013), American scholar, author, commentator and filmmaker
 Saul Leiter (1923-2013), American photographer, early user of color photography in fine art
 Saul Lieberman (1898–1983), Israeli rabbi and scholar of Talmud
 Saul Milton, British musician, member of Chase & Status
 Saul Levi Morteira (c. 1596–1660), Dutch rabbi
 Saul Moyal, Egyptian Olympic fencer
 Saúl Ñíguez (born 1994), Spanish footballer
 Saúl Ongaro, Argentine footballer
 Saúl Phillips (born 1984), Costa Rican footballer
 Saul Phillips (basketball) (born 1972), American basketball coach and player
 Saul Raisin (born 1983), road bicycle racer
 Saul Robbins (1922–2010), American toy manufacturer, co-founder of Remco
 Saul Rogovin (1923–1995), American baseball player
 Saul Rubinek (born 1948), German-born Canadian actor and director
 Saul Shapiro, American known for public policy development on digital broadcast
 Saul Steinberg (1914–1999), Romanian-born American cartoonist and illustrator
 Saul Steinberg (businessman) (1939-2012), American businessman and financier
 Saúl Suárez, Colombian football manager in the 1990s
 Saul Teukolsky (born 1947), South African astrophysicist and professor
 Saul Winstein (1912–1969), Canadian chemist
 Saul Williams (born 1972), American rapper, poet, actor and musician
 Saul Zaentz (1921–2014), American film producer and owner of Fantasy Records

See also
 Shaul
 Sol (given name)

English masculine given names
Hebrew masculine given names
Spanish masculine given names